is the pen name of a Japanese manga artist born on November 29 in Sendai, Miyagi Prefecture, Japan.

Sakurano made her debut in 1995 with her story Mother Doll, which tied for first place in the 1st Enix 21st Century Manga Prize contest, sharing the prize with Yasaka Mamiko's Kaze no Daidōzoku. Her representative work is Mamotte Shugogetten, which was adapted into an anime television series and an OVA series. After a dispute in 2001, Sakurano stopped publishing Shugogetten in Enix's Shōnen Gangan and moved the publication to Comic Blade, published by Mag Garden under the title Mamotte Shugogetten! Retrouvailles.

Works
All works are listed chronologically.

Manga
Mamotte Shugogetten! (11 volumes, 1996–2000, Shōnen Gangan)
Shōuindō no Emily: Sakurano Minene Short Story Collection (1 volume, 1997, Gangan Comics)
Jōshū Tōzoku Aratamegata Hinagiku Kenzan! (3 volumes, 1999–2001, Gangan Wing)
Healing Planet (1 volume, 2000–2001, Shōnen Gangan)
Mamotte Shugogetten! Retrouvailles (6 volumes, 2002–2005, Comic Blade)
Madoromyāna no Komoriuta (2004, Comic Blade Masamune)
Yggdrasil Liveline (2004–2005, Comic Blade Masamune)
Hinagiku Kenzan: Ippon Ōkamachi-hen (1 volume, 2006–2007, Comic Blade Masamune)
Fairial Garden (2007–2010, Comic Blade)
Hoshi no Dai Circus (2011-ongoing, Comic Blade)

Art books
 (1999-04-18, Enix)
Days of Moonlight (2003, Mag Garden,  (limited edition),  (standard edition)

Anthologies
These are anthologies in which Sakurano's works appeared.
, (Super Comic Gekijō Vol.1: Tōshinden 2, Enix)
, (Super Comic Gekijō Vol.2: Fire Emblem, Enix)

References

External links
 Sakuranosono (official site)
 Momo Five (official blog)

Year of birth unknown
Women manga artists
Manga artists from Miyagi Prefecture
Manga artists from Shizuoka (city)
20th-century Japanese writers
21st-century Japanese writers
20th-century Japanese women writers
21st-century Japanese women writers
Female comics writers
Japanese female comics artists
Pseudonymous artists
Pseudonymous women writers
20th-century pseudonymous writers
21st-century pseudonymous writers